Xenia Hodel (born 27 November 1998) is a Swiss female handballer for Spono Eagles in the Spar Premium League and the Swiss national team.

She made her official debut on the Swiss national team on 7 October 2015, against Germany. She represented Switzerland for the first time at the 2022 European Women's Handball Championship in Slovenia, Montenegro and North Macedonia.

Achievements
 SPAR Premium League
Winner: 2018, 2022
 Schweizer Cupsieger
Winner: 2018

References

External links

1998 births
Living people
Swiss female handball players
People from Lucerne
21st-century Swiss women
Expatriate handball players
Swiss expatriate sportspeople in Germany